K. H. Hussain is a computing expert and typeface designer from Kerala, India. In the early days of the Malayalam computing, he came into the field of Malayalam computing by creating his own Malayalam font and text editor.

Hussain's major contributions include eleven fonts including Rachana, Meera, Keraliyam, Tamil Inime, Dyuthi, Uroob and Panmana, the preservation of millions of pages in five digital archives, and the Arabic Malayalam keyboard. He was also responsible for setting up the first computer based information system in Malayalam.

Biography

K. H. Hussain was born in 1952 in Eriyat near Kodungallur in  Thrissur district of Kerala. He graduated from UC College, Aluva in 1978 with a degree in mathematics. After that he done his master's degree in Information Science from Indira Gandhi National Open University.

Attracted towards the Naxalite movement in Kerala, Hussain was jailed for 20 months for working against the Emergency in India. T. N. Joey was his political mentor. After the Emergency, he worked as a teacher at a tuition center in Kunnamkulam for some time. After graduating in Library Science from the University of Kerala in 1980, he worked as a Librarian in the Kerala Forest Research Institute in 1981. While working as librarian, he entered the field of Information technology and font design. He later joined as scientist in Kerala Forest Research Institute, and retired from the same.

In 1999, Hussain joined the Rachana Aksharavedi, a voluntary organization working for Malayalam computing. He entered the Malayalam computing field with R. Chithrajakumar and his team, composing a Malayalam unique font called Rachana, and a Malayalam language text editor. Hussain became part of the Rachana due to his knowledge of computers. The Unicode font released in 2006 was widely circulated under the leadership of Swathanthra Malayalam Computing. first published book in Rachana font was Guru Nithya Chaitanya Yati's Thumpoo Muthal Suryan Vare.

Hussain has worked with the Sayahna Foundation, aimed at preserving classic Malayalam books, founded in 2015 by C. V. Radhakrishnan.

Hussain's major contributions include eleven fonts including Rachana, Meera, Keraliyam, Tamil Inime, Dyuthi, Uroob and Panmana, the preservation of millions of pages in five digital archives, and the Arabic Malayalam keyboard. He was also responsible for setting up the first computer based information system in Malayalam.

Awards and honours
 Dr. Pradeepan Pampirikunnu Memorial Mathrubhasha (Mother Tongue) Award instituted by Kalady Sree Sankaracharya Sanskrit University for his contributions the Malayalam language.
 Government of Kerala e-Governance Award 2010

References

20th-century Indian designers
1952 births
Living people
Indian typographers and type designers
People from Thrissur district